

Codes 

X